Richard Adrian William Sharp OBE  (born 9 September 1938) is a retired English rugby union player. Born in India during the British Raj, his family moved to Cornwall, England, where he was educated at Montpelier School, Paignton and Blundell's School in the neighbouring county of Devon and at Balliol College, Oxford. He is a former player at Redruth R.F.C., Wasps FC, Bristol FC and England (14 caps) rugby union fly-half and captain. He played for England while at Oxford and led England to the Five Nations title in 1963.  He played cricket for Cornwall in the Minor Counties Championship between 1957 and 1970.

He was appointed Officer of the Order of the British Empire (OBE) in the 1986 New Year Honours, for services to Sport, particularly in the South West.

Bernard Cornwell named the fictional character Richard Sharpe after him.

References

External links

Oxford Alumni
The Book of English International Rugby 1871–1982
Hammers of the Scots, The Daily Telegraph, 1 February 2007

1938 births
Living people
Alumni of Balliol College, Oxford
Bristol Bears players
British & Irish Lions rugby union players from England
Cornish rugby union players
Cornwall cricketers
England international rugby union players
English cricketers
English rugby union players
Officers of the Order of the British Empire
Oxford University RFC players
People educated at Blundell's School
People from Redruth
Sportspeople from Cornwall
Wasps RFC players
Rugby union fly-halves